Intercondyloid fossa may refer to:
 Intercondylar area of the upper tibia, including the anterior intercondyloid fossa and posterior intercondyloid fossa
 Intercondylar fossa of femur